Auchel is a commune in the Pas-de-Calais department in the Hauts-de-France region in northern France.

Geography

History
Following the discovery of coal deposits in the area in 1851, the town grew as the demand for
coal increased in France. This old mining town had close to 15,000 inhabitants in the 1950s. 
The coal recession in the late 1960s lead to a constant decline in population, despite the efforts of the municipality to attract and keep people here during and after the recession.

Population
The inhabitants are called Auchellois.

Sights
 The church of St. Martin, dating from the sixteenth century.
 A museum about coal mining.

International relations
Auchel is twinned with:
  West Malling, in the county of Kent, England.
  Iserlohn, in North Rhine-Westphalia, Germany.

Notable people
 
 
Auchel is the birthplace of:
 Xavier Beauvois, actor, director and screenwriter.
 Angela Behelle, writer
 Pierre Laigle, football player
 Augustin Lesage, French spiritualist artist. Lesage is one of the most fascinating figures associated with Art Brut
 Stéphane Lecocq, professional footballer
 Fred Personne, actor
 Afida Turner, singer, songwriter, actress, and media personality

See also
 Communes of the Pas-de-Calais department

References

External links

 An history of Auchel 
 Harmonie municipale website 
 Auchel town hall website 

Communes of Pas-de-Calais
County of Artois